Mireia Trias Jordán (born 22 March 2000) is a Spanish professional racing cyclist, who currently rides for UCI Women's Continental Team . Her elder sister Ariadna Trias is also a professional cyclist, and was a member of the  team in 2020.

References

External links
 

2000 births
Living people
Spanish female cyclists
People from Baix Empordà
Sportspeople from the Province of Girona
Cyclists from Catalonia
21st-century Spanish women